Remlinger is a surname. Notable people with the surname include:

Mike Remlinger (born 1966), American baseball player
Paul Remlinger (1871–1964), French physician and biologist

See also
Remlingen (disambiguation)
Remlinger Farms, Tourist attractions in King County, Washington